Rottach-Egern is a municipality (Gemeinde Rottach-Egern am Tegernsee) and town located at Lake Tegernsee in the district of Miesbach in Upper Bavaria, Germany, about 55 km (35 miles) south of central Munich. Late Austrian actor Walter Slezak is buried in this area.

Geography
Rottach-Egern is located in the Tegernsee Valley, stretching southward from the shore of Lake Tegernsee to the Austrian border. The villages of Rottach, Egern, Gasse, Schorn, Sonnenmoos, Staudach, Weißach and Wolfsgrub have merged to become parts of a single settlement near the lake. More hamlets in the municipality are Berg, Ellmau, Hagrain, Haslau, Kalkofen, Oberach, Sutten and Trinis, Brandstatt, Enterrottach, Erlach, Kühzagl and Unterwallberg.

In addition to the shoreline of the Tegernsee, the municipal area includes other small lakes of which Widrigsee (also Glocknersee), the Suttensee, the Riederecksee and Röthensteiner lakes are the main ones.

The administrative center is in Rottach. The Catholic parish church of St. Lawrence is located in the district of Egern.

Population

In 2011 there were also 1,228 people with a second home in the municipality, desirable for discretion.

Neighboring communities
 Bad Wiessee
 Gmund am Tegernsee
 Kreuth
 Stadt Tegernsee
 Schliersee

References

External links

Miesbach (district)